Faz (also Romanized as Fāz; also known as Pāz and Bāzh) is a village in Tabadkan Rural District, in the Central District of Mashhad County, Razavi Khorasan Province, Iran. At the 2006 census, its population was 688, in 193 families.

References 

Populated places in Mashhad County